Matthew Vine (born 1959), is a male former weightlifter who competed for Great Britain and England.

Weightlifting career
Vine represented Great Britain in the 1988 Summer Olympics.

He represented England in the +110 kg super-heavyweight division, at the 1990 Commonwealth Games in Auckland, New Zealand.

References

1959 births
English male weightlifters
Weightlifters at the 1990 Commonwealth Games
Weightlifters at the 1988 Summer Olympics
Sportspeople from Maidstone
Olympic weightlifters of Great Britain
Living people
Commonwealth Games competitors for England